Jibesh Kumar (born 25 July 1973)  is an Indian politician belonging to the Bharatiya Janata Party. He is currently a member of the Bihar Legislative Assembly from Jale constituency in 2020 Bihar Legislative Assembly election. 

Jibesh Kumar was Minister of Labour Resources Department and Information Technology in Bihar Government in Seventh Nitish Kumar ministry from 16 Nov. 2020 to 9 August 2022.

Political background 
Jibesh Kumar was an active member of Akhil Bharatiya Vidyarthi Parishad from 1981 to 1998. Jibesh Kumar was working as a Primary Member from 1998 to 2002 and he has been working as an Active Member of Bhartiya Janta Party since 2002.

The first time he was elected to the Bihar Legislative Assembly was from the Jale constituency as a member of the  Bharatiya Janata Party in 2015.

Again in the 2020 election, he had won from the same seat Jale constituency with a margin of 21,796 votes and was elected for the second time for the Bihar Legislative Assembly as a Member of Bharatiya Janata Party.

References 

Living people
Indian politicians
1973 births
State cabinet ministers of Bihar
Bharatiya Janata Party politicians from Bihar